Massingir District is a district of Gaza Province in southwestern Mozambique. The administrative center of the district is in Massingir. The district is located in the west of the province, and borders with Chicualacuala District in the north, Mabalane District in the east, Chókwè District in the southeast, Magude District of Maputo Province in the south, and with South Africa in the west. It has a population of 28,470 (2007).

Geography
The Rio dos Elefantes and the Mazimulhpe River are the principal rivers in the area. Many rivers are seasonal and flow only during the rainy season. There are 10 lakes in the district. The Massingir Dam is located on the Rio dos Elefantes and is an important breeding ground for the Nile crocodile.

Limpopo National Park, part of Great Limpopo Transfrontier Park, is shared between Massingir, Chicualacuala, and Mabalane Districts.

History
The district was established in 1972, after the construction of the dam.

Demographics
As of 2005, 45% of the population of the district was younger than 15 years. 20% of the population spoke Portuguese. The most common mothertongue among the population was Tsonga. 74% were analphabetic, mostly women.

Administrative divisions
The district is divided into three postos, Massingir (three localities), Mavoze (three localities), and  Zulo (three localities).

Economy
4% of the households in the district have access to electricity.

Agriculture
In the district, there are 3,500 farms which have on average  of land. The main agricultural products are corn, cassava, cowpea, peanut, sweet potato, and rice.

Transportation
None of the secondary roads are paved, and most are in a bad state.

References 

Districts in Gaza Province
States and territories established in 1972
1972 establishments in the Portuguese Empire